SS Greenville Victory  was a cargo Victory ship built in 1944, during World War II under the Emergency Shipbuilding program. The ship’s United States Maritime Commission designation was VC2-S-AP3, hull number 18 (V-18). Post-war she was acquired by the U.S. Army and renamed as USAT Greenville Victory. She was acquired by the U.S. Navy in 1950, renamed USNS Greenville Victory (T-AK-237) and assigned to the Military Sea Transportation Service (MSTS) who operated her safely through the Korean War and Vietnam War campaigns. She was the lead ship in her class of 9 ships that were transferred to the MSTS in 1950. She returned home with two battle stars to her credit and was struck in 1987.

Victory built in California
Greenville Victory  was laid down under U.S. Maritime Commission contract by California Shipbuilding Corporation, Los Angeles, California; 21 March 1944; launched 28 May 1944; sponsored by Miss Mary J. Vukov; and delivered to the War Shipping Administration (WSA) 8 July 1944.

World War II operations
During the remainder of the World War II, SS Greenville Victory served as a merchant ship under charter to Sea Shipping Company of New York City. She served in the Pacific War, participating in the Battle of Okinawa. In Okinawa from 27 May 1945 to 19 June 1945 she supplied goods as a cargo ship and used her deck guns to defend herself and other ships from attacks.

U.S. Army service
Following World War II, she transported cargo in the Atlantic Ocean and the Pacific Ocean as the USAT Greenville Victory. She was transferred to the Army Transportation Service in the spring of 1948. Part of her service included returning the remains of U.S. servicemembers who had been killed in World War II for reburial at home, including the remains of 3,734 servicemembers who arrived at the Brooklyn Army Base on 26 June 1948, most of them coming from cemeteries in France.

Acquired by the Navy on 1 March 1950, she was assigned to MSTS as a (T-AK-237).

Korean War era service
Manned by a Maritime Commission civilian crew, Greenville Victory, from 1950 to 1953, operated in the Atlantic Ocean and the Caribbean, carrying military cargo to French, English, and German ports; Guantanamo Bay; and the Panama Canal Zone.

Between 19 February and 9 May 1953, she sailed out of New York City to the Far East and back, loaded with ammunition for Korea. After completing a run to Europe and back, she again departed New York 9 July 1953 for the Far East. She reached Yokohama, Japan, 9 August and during the next 2 months operated in the Western Pacific Ocean, carrying ammunition to Formosa and to French forces fighting Communist Viet-Minh guerillas in French Indochina. Sailing from Yokohama 4 1953 October via San Francisco, California, she reached New York City 6 November 1953 to resume cargo runs to Europe.

Services at the world's poles

During the next 2 years, Greenville Victory steamed primarily between New York City and West European ports. In June and July 1954 she sailed to the Western Mediterranean to replenish at-sea ships of the U.S. 6th Fleet. On 16 November 1955, she departed Newport, Rhode Island, for Antarctica and arrived at McMurdo Sound 16 January 1956 to provision ships of Task Force 43, as part of the Navy's Operation Deep Freeze. Departing Antarctica on 5 February 1956, and traveling via New Zealand, she arrived in New York on 28 March. Before the operation her hull was strengthened for Arctic ice conditions.
 
Between 1956 and 1964 Greenville Victory maintained a busy schedule transporting cargo to American bases scattered throughout the world. She replenished Task Force 43 on three more Antarctic deployments; and, from December to February 1956–57, 1957–38, and 1960–61, she operated in Antarctic waters. Cargo runs sent her to the Caribbean in 1958, 1960, and 1962 and to Thule, Greenland, during September and October 1958.

She also deployed with the 6th Fleet five times between June 1956 and March 1964. On two deployments in 1963 and 1964 she transited the Suez Canal, steaming to India and Pakistan.

Greenville Victory departed Norfolk, Virginia, 6 October 1964 to participate in the massive transatlantic trooplift exercise, "Steel Pike I." Departing Morehead City, North Carolina, 8 October, she closed the Spanish coast off Rota 19 October. For more than 2 weeks she discharged supplies and cargo in support of amphibious and shore operations. Departing Rota 7 November, she steamed via Morehead City to New York, arriving 20 November.

Vietnam War era service
Greenville Victory departed New York 22 November 1964 for duty in the Western Pacific for the Vietnam War. Sailing via San Diego, California, she arrived Guam 24 December. During the next month she steamed to Okinawa, Korea, and Japan, carrying cargo. Arriving at Manila, Philippines, on 26 January 1965, she sailed the 28th for Pearl Harbor and San Francisco, California. After reaching the U.S. West Coast on 25 February, she made a run out of San Francisco, California, to Seattle, Washington, then sailed for the U.S. Gulf Coast on 15 March, arriving New Orleans, Louisiana, on 28 March 1965.
 
During the next 5 months, Greenville Victory made cargo runs in the Atlantic out of Norfolk, Virginia, and New York. She departed New York 20 October 1965 after a voyage to Labrador and back. Steaming via Norfolk, Virginia, and Long Beach, California, she reached Yokohama, Japan, on 22 November 1965. Loaded with military cargo, she sailed for South Vietnam 30 November and arrived at Saigon 16 December. The following day she sailed via Vũng Tàu for the U.S. West Coast, arriving San Francisco 3 January 1966.
 
Greenville Victory replenished her holds with military supplies before returning to the Western Pacific. Sailing via Sasebo, Japan, she reached Bangkok, Thailand, on 13 February 1966. She sailed 22 February for South Vietnam and arrived Vũng Tàu the next day.

Having unloaded, she sailed 1 March 1966 for the U.S. West Coast to transport additional military material from the United States to South Vietnam. She continued operations between the United States and the Western Pacific until transferred to the Atlantic at mid-year. In 1967 she was busy supplying NATO forces in Europe.

In the aftermath of the Fall of Saigon on 30 April 1975 the ship took onboard over 5400 South Vietnamese refugees.

On 12 May 1975, six of the USNS Greenville Victory crew volunteered to help the recovery of the SS Mayaguez. The six received Merchant Marine Distinguished Service Medals for their role during the action: Clinton Harriman, Karl Lonsdale, Robert Griffin, Michael Saltwick, Hermino Rivera and Epifanio Rodriguez.<ref>[http://www.usmm.org/mayaguez.html usmm.org, SS Mayaguez]</ref>

Post-war decommissioning and career
On 22 March 1976 Greenville Victory was transferred to the U.S. Maritime Administration who placed her in the National Defense Reserve Fleet, James River Group, at Lee Hall, Virginia. On 26 May 1983 she was sold for scrapping at Brownsville, Texas. She was struck from the Navy List on 16 January 1987.

Honors and awards
Greenville Victory participated in the following campaigns:
 Vietnam Defense – 16 December 1965
 Vietnamese Counteroffensive''' – 23 February 1965
 Battle Stars" in World War II for war action during the assault occupation of Okinawa from 27 May 1945 to 19 June 1945

Eligible Greenville Victory'' personnel were authorized the following:
 National Defense Service Medal (2)
 Korean Service Medal
 Antarctic Service Medal
 Vietnam Service Medal (2)
 United Nations Service Medal
 Republic of Vietnam Campaign Medal
 Republic of Korea War Service Medal (retroactive)

See also
List of Victory ships
 Liberty ship
 Type C1 ship
 Type C2 ship
 Type C3 ship

References

 
 NavSource Online: Service Ship Photo Archive – T-AK-237 Greenville Victory

 

Victory ships
Ships built in Los Angeles
1944 ships
World War II merchant ships of the United States
Ships of the United States Army
Greenville Victory-class cargo ships
Ammunition ships of the United States Navy
Korean War auxiliary ships of the United States
Vietnam War auxiliary ships of the United States